Lukasz Plawecki (born January 25, 1987) is a Polish lightweight kickboxer, fighting out of HALNY Nowy Sącz Gym, Poland. He is World Kickboxing Network World Super Welterweight Champion, and the ISKA World Super Middleweight champion.

Polish professional boxer who started his sports career in 2021.

Biography and career
Lukas Plawecki started his martial arts training under Andrzej Śliwa in Nowy Sącz. When he moved to Cracow he joined Tomasz Mamulski gym (Polish National Team trainer). Since 2008 he is running his own club Halny Nowy Sącz Gym where he is main coach. He works with Martin Belak, coach in Slovakia Fire Gym during his preparations for professional fights.

Starting from 2006 he fought 29 times in professional kickboxing matches.

In 2015 he fought for Kunlun Fight for the first time. He lost to Superbon Banchamek during Kunlun Fight 25 event. One year later he participated in Kunlun Fight elimination tournament held on Kunlun Fight 46. He was given extra round in semifinal fight against Nishikawa Tomoyuki and two extra rounds in final fight with Tian Xin. He lost to Tian Xin after split decision.

In 2016 he was also competing for King of Kings. In April he scored draw after extra round against Alexandru Prepeliță and in November he won over Viacheslav Tevenish.

On 3 December 2016, during Simple The Best 13 event in Nowa Sol, Poland he won his first World Championship title after defending Lello Perego in five round fight. The event and title were sanctioned by World Kickboxing Network.

In 2017 he was signed by Glory and will make his debut at Glory 38: Chicago.

In 2018 he moved up to -77 kg and in his first fight in new weight class he defeated Wojciech Wierzbicki for Fight Exclusive Night champion belt.

Lukas Plawecki is ranked in first place in "Polish male kickboxers rankings" at Madfight24.com portal.

In 2019 Plawecki won the ISKA World Super Middleweight title, through a decision victory over Rodrigo Mineiro, and successfully defended it with a decision win over Michalis Manoli.

Ciric is scheduled to fight Robin Ciric at Enfusion's September Nijmegen event.

Titles 
Professional
 2017 MFC Champion Title (-70 kg)
 2017 Celtic Gladiator Champion (-70 kg)
 2017 International Professional Combat Council K-1 World Champion (-72,5 kg)
 2016 WKN World Kickboxing Super Welterweight Champion (-72.6 kg)
 2016 Kunlun Fight World Max Group O Tournament Runner Up
 2019 ISKA World Super Middleweight Freestyle Kickboxing Champion
 One successful title defense
Amateur 
 2009 
 Second place on World Cup in Szeged Hungary  -71 kg 
 2006 
 Third place on World Cup in Szeged Hungary  -71 kg

Professional kickboxing record 

|- style="background:#cfc;"
|2020-9-5
|Win
| align="left" | Michalis Manoli
|HFO Solpark
|Kleszczów, Poland
|Decision (Unanimous)
|5
|3:00
|-
! colspan="8" style="background:white" |
|- style="background:#fbb;"
|2019-12-7
|Loss
| align="left" | Sergej Braun
|Mix Fight Championship 27, Tournament Semifinal
|Frankfurt, Germany
|TKO 
|3
|
|-
|- style="background:#cfc;"
|2019-5-18
|Win
| align="left" | Rodrigo Mineiro
|HFO Nowe Rozdanie 
|Nowy Sącz, Poland
|Decision (Unanimous)
|5
|3:00
|-
! colspan="8" style="background:white" |
|- style="background:#fbb;"
|2019-1-12
|Loss
| align="left" | Dominik Zadora
|Fight Exclusive Night 23
|Lubin, Poland
|TKO (Leg Kicks)
|3
|
|-
! colspan="8" style="background:white" |
|- style="background:#cfc;"
|2018-10-27
|Win
| align="left" | Waldemar Wiebe
|HFO 5
|Nowy Sącz, Poland
|KO
|3
|3:00
|-
! colspan="8" style="background:white" |
|- style="background:#cfc;"
|2018-09-22
|Win
| align="left" | Anghel Cardos
|MFC 14
|Zielona Góra, Poland
|Decision
|5
|3:00
|-
! colspan="8" style="background:white" |
|- style="background:#cfc;"
|- style="background:#cfc;"
|2018-05-25
|Win
| align="left" | Wojciech Wierzbicki
|FEN 21
|Wrocław, Poland
|Decision
|5
|3:00
|-
! colspan="8" style="background:white" |
|- style="background:#cfc;"
|- style="background:#cfc;"
|2017-12-16
|Win
| align="left" | Denis Teleshman
|MFC
|Nowa Sól, Poland
|KO
|1
|0:43
|-
! colspan="8" style="background:white" |
|- style="background:#cfc;"
|2017-11-04
|Win
| align="left" | Tomas Drabik
|Celtic Gladiator 15
|Nowy Sącz, Poland
|Decision
|5
|3:00
|-
! colspan="8" style="background:white" |
|- style="background:#cfc;"
|2017-09-23
|Win
| align="left" | Yankuba Juwara
|HFO 4
|Nowy Sącz, Poland
|TKO
|3
|2:47
|-
! colspan="8" style="background:white" |
|-
|- style="background:#fbb;"
|2017-07-15
|Loss
| align="left" | Feng Xingli
|Kunlun Fight 64
|Chongqing, China
|Decision (Split)
|3
|3:00
|- style="background:#fbb;"
|2017-02-24
|Loss
| align="left" | Niclas Larsen
|Glory 38
|Chicago, USA
|Decision (Unanimous)
|3
|3:00
|- style="background:#cfc;"
|2016-12-03
|Win
| align="left" | Lefterio Perego
|MFC 11
|Nowa Sól, Poland
|Decision
|5
|3:00
|-
! colspan="8" style="background:white" |
|- 
|- style="background:#cfc;"
|2016-11-05
|Win
| align="left" | Viacheslav Tevins
|KOK World GP in Riga
|Riga, Latvia
|Decision
|3
|3:00
|- style="background:#fbb;"
|2016-04-23
|Loss
| align="left" | Tian Xin
|Kunlun Fight 46
|Kunming, China
|2nd Ex.R Decision
|5
|3:00
|-
! colspan="8" style="background:white" |
|- 
|- style="background:#cfc;"
|2016-04-23
|Win
| align="left" | Nishikawa Tomoyuki
|Kunlun Fight 46
|Kunming, China
|Ex.R Decision
|4
|3:00
|- style="background:#cfc;"
|2016-05-01
|Win
| align="left" |  Łukasz Kaczmarczyk
|HFO 2: Kunlun Elimination
|Krynica Zdrój, Poland
|Decision
|3
|3:00
|- style="background:#cfc;"
|2016-05-01
|Win
| align="left" | Krystof Mares
|HFO 2: Kunlun Elimination
|Krynica Zdrój, Poland
|Decision
|3
|3:00
|- style="background:#c5d2ea;"
|2016-04-09
|Draw
| align="left" | Alexandru Prepeliță
|KOK World GP in Moldova
|Cisinau, Moldova
|Decision
|4
|3:00
|- style="background:#fbb;"
|2016-01-30
|Loss
| align="left" | Filip Solheid
|Thai Boxe Mania 2016
|Turin, Italy
|Decision
|5
|3:00
|- style="background:#fbb;"
|2015-12-05
|Loss
| align="left" | Vladislav Tuinov
|W5 Winners Energy
|Vienna, Austria
|Decision
|3
|3:00
|- style="background:#fbb;"
|2015-08-29
|Loss
| align="left" | Pavol Garaj
|Knockout Fight Night
|Bratislava, Slovakia
|Decision
|3
|3:00
|- style="background:#fbb;"
|2015-05-15
|Loss
| align="left" | Superbon Banchamek
|Kunlun Fight 25
|Banska Bystryca, Slovakia
|Decision
|3
|3:00
|- style="background:#cfc;"
|2015-02-21
|Win
| align="left" | Kamil Stolarczyk
|Battle Of Warriors Extra 2
|Poland
|Decision
|3
|3:00
|- style="background:#cfc;"
|2014-10-25
|Win
| align="left" | Boubkari Hicham
|Pride of the Royal City
|Cracov, Poland
|KO
|1
|
|- style="text-align:center; background:#cfc;"
|2014-04-05
|Win
| align="left" | Kormanos Miroslav
|Battle Of Warriors Extra
|Poland
|KO
|1
|
|- style="text-align:center; background:#cfc;"
|2014-03-08
|Win
| align="left" | Cerven David
|Battle Of Warriors Kraków
|Poland
|KO
|1
|
|- style="text-align:center; background:#cfc;"
|2013-04-05
|Win
| align="left" | Tyszkiewicz Damian
|NGDM Nowy Targ
|Poland
|Decision
|3
|3:00
|- style="background:#fbb;"
|2012-06-10
|Loss
| align="left" | Weimer Dima
|K-1 Box Nacht Cottbus
|Germany, Cottbus
|Decision
|3
|3:00
|- style="background:#fbb;"
|2012-07-25
|Loss
| align="left" | Theptanee Winai
|Ibiza Muay Thai Hiszpania
|Ibiza, Spain
|Decision
|3
|3:00
|- style="background:#cfc;"
|2012-07-25
|Win
| align="left" | Fonda Luca
|Ibiza Muay Thai Hiszpania
|Ibiza, Spain
|Decision
|3
|3:00
|- style="background:#fbb;"
|2012-06-22
|Loss
| align="left" | Garcia Jean Philippe
|Carcharias Boxing 2012 Perpignan
|Perpignan, France
|Decision
|5
|3:00
|- style="background:#cfc;"
|2010-04-24
|Win
| align="left" | Jędrzejewski Daniel
|Angels Of Fire Płock
|Płock, Poland
|Decision
|3
|3:00
|- style="background:#cfc;"
|2010-03-06
|Win
| align="left" | Pietrzak Łukasz
|Wind Of Damage Nowy Sącz
|Nowy Sącz, Poland
|KO
|2
|
|- style="text-align:center; background:#cfc;"
|2009-12-12
|Win
| align="left" |Wehrberger Gleb
|CHAMPCLASS FIGHT NIGHT
|Germany
|Decision
|3
|3:00
|- style="background:#fbb;"
|2009-11-19
|Loss
| align="left" | Issoz Petr
|Angels Of Fire Płock
|Płock, Poland
|Decision
|3
|3:00
|- style="background:#cfc;"
|2009-02-07
|Win
| align="left" | Köylü Cihan
|Gorlice Fight Night Gorlice
|Gorlice, Poland
|KO
|2
|
|- style="text-align:center; background:#fbb;"
|2008-03-23
|Loss
| align="left" | Palanto Jesse
|Fight Festival Helsinki
|Helsinki, Finland
|Decision
|5
|3:00
|- style="background:#cfc;"
|2008-01-28
|Win
| align="left" |Sidorov Dainis
|Wielka Gala Kickboxingu Siedlce
|Siedlce, Poland
|Decision
|3
|3:00
|- style="background:#fbb;"
|2007-08-30
|Loss
| align="left" | Tomczykowski Michał
|Gala Boksu Zawodowego
|Ostróda, Poland
|Decision
|3
|3:00
|- style="background:#cfc;"
|2007-07-07
|Win
| align="left" | Erkmen Ozkan
|PZKB Event
|Poland
|
|
|
|- style="text-align:center; background:#fbb;"
|2006-09-30
|Loss
| align="left" |Emil Martirosjan
|PZKB Event
|Poland
|Decision
|3
|3:00
|-
| colspan=9 | Legend:

Professional boxing record

References 

Polish male kickboxers
1987 births
Living people
Sportspeople from Nowy Sącz
Kunlun Fight kickboxers
Polish male boxers